Elektrozavodskaya is a Moscow Railway station on the Kazansky and Ryazansky suburban railway lines in Moscow, Russia. It is located on the Basmanny-Sokolinaya Gora district border (Central and Eastern administrative okrugs respectively),  from Moscow Kazanskaya railway station.

There are exits at the Semyonovskaya Embankment, Golyanovsky Lane, Bolshaya Semyonovskaya Street.

Gallery

References

Railway stations in Moscow
Railway stations of Moscow Railway
Railway stations in Russia opened in 1949